Crash & Burn is the debut studio album by American singer Traci Braxton. eOne and Soul World released the album October 7, 2014. Braxton had previously released music with her sisters as part of the group The Braxtons. Cliff Jones and David Lindsey were the album's executive producers. Crash & Burn is a R&B album, which Braxton said had influences from adult contemporary music. Critics thought the songs focused on love but Braxton clarified that the lyrics dealt with her attempts to start a solo music career.

Crash & Burn received a mixed response from critics. Some liked the album's production quality though other commentators criticized the amount of Auto-Tune used on it. The album peaked at number 108 on the Billboard Hot 200 chart and sold 4,000 copies in its first week. It also appeared on other Billboard charts. Two singles—"Last Call" and "Perfect Time"—were released. The lead single was promoted through a music video and was received negatively by critics. The recording and promotion of Crash & Burn was included in episodes of Braxton Family Values.

Background and recording
While appearing in the reality television series Braxton Family Values, Traci Braxton received a solo record deal with eOne. She was previously signed to Atlantic in the 1990s alongside her sisters as part of the group The Braxtons. Braxton pursued a solo career after her manager encouraged her to take music more seriously. She recorded Crash & Burn at Soul World Entertainment in Upper Marlboro, Maryland, and StarMakers Studios in Beltsville, Maryland. Cliff Jones and David Lindsey were the album's executive producers. Braxton said that they "brought out [her] sound and story" and compared the collaboration to that between Jimmy Jam and Terry Lewis and Janet Jackson. The recording process was shown in a season three episode of Braxton Family Values.

Composition and lyrics
Crash & Burn is a R&B album that consists of eleven tracks. Braxton described the sound as "the soulful adult contemporary from back in the 90s with a little mixture of today's R&B." Andy Kellman of AllMusic noted the songs contained considerable use of Auto-Tune. Describing the vocals, MadameNoires Veronica Wells said Traci's vocal range was higher than Toni's yet lower than Tamar's. Braxton said that she wanted her music to sound like a combination of Mary J. Blige and Jill Scott. Music critics had varying interpretations of the album's lyrics. Kellman wrote that the songs revolve around "heartbreak, romance, lust, and perseverance", while others felt that Braxton referenced problems within her marriage. The singer said that Crash & Burn was about her attempts to pursue a music career while facing obstacles.

In the second track, "What About Love?", Braxton sings about a romantic relationship that she is unable to fix by herself. The following song, "Stay Sippin", a duet with Raheem DeVaughn, who is the only featured artist on the standard edition of the album, revolves around whether the singer should love or leave her partner. During the midtempo ballad "Last Call", Braxton sings about repairing a damaged relationship. On the ninth track "Passion", she flirts with a man, but questions if they have a future as a couple; Charles referred to the song's composition as "upbeat [and] bubbly". Braxton sings about her partner's negative qualities on the tenth track "Reasons", which Charles describes as "snappy" and likened to Toni Braxton's 1993 single "Another Sad Love Song". The album's final track "Crash & Burn" focuses on "hav[ing] success in the fullness of time, and with the right intentions". Khayree Ali and Niko are featured on the album's bonus tracks.

Release and promotion
eOne and Soul World released Crash & Burn as an audio CD and digital download on October 7, 2014, Toni Braxton's birthday. An edition of the album, with two bonus tracks, was also made available at Best Buy. Braxton released the album artwork and the track listing in September 2014, which Khayla of SoulBounce.com described as "fierce and edgy". Following the release of Crash & Burn, Braxton was criticized for being "past her prime for being a recording artist". She responded by encouraging others to follow their dreams.

Singles

"Last Call" was released on July 15, 2014, as the lead single from Crash & Burn. While Veronica Wells praised the single, two reviewers from SoulBounce.com called the track as unmemorable. The single was featured on the fourth season of Braxton Family Values. Braxton performed it at the Concert for a Cause: A Night to Support Childhood Literacy at Howard University in September 2014. During the performance, she gave her husband a lap dance, which Wells called inappropriate for the event. 

The accompanying music video was released on September 8, 2014, through Braxton's Vevo account. In it, Braxton flirts with a man jogging in her neighborhood. Her siblings—Toni, Tamar, and Trina Braxton—help her attract the man to the house, where the pair cuddle on the patio and drink Hennessy. D-Money of SoulBounce.com responded negatively to Traci's wardrobe and hair styles. He wrote the video had "a hazy, slightly artificial look to every single frame". "Last Call" peaked at number sixteen on the Billboard Adult R&B Songs chart.

"Perfect Time" was released as the album's second single. Before performing it for radio industry programmers, Braxton had a panic attack.

Reception
Crash & Burn received mixed reviews from music critics. Phinesse Demps of The Baltimore Times responded positively to the album's production and commended Braxton for creating "a very adult sound". Praising the compositions as "undoubtedly contemporary and sleek", Andy Kellman wrote that the album contains a "decent assortment of adult-oriented R&B songs". Melody Charles referred to Crash & Burn as Braxton's way of building "her own distinct groove" but felt it was not as polished as music released by her sisters Toni and Tamar; Charles was also critical of the amount of Auto-Tune used on the album. On Twitter, Tamar panned the album for its use of Auto-Tune; she wrote: "Do the Grammys have a duet with auto tune category yet?" Traci replied that she was "not bothered at all" by her sister's criticism.

On October 25, 2014, "Crash & Burn" debuted at #108 on the Billboard Hot 200 with sales of 4,000 in its first week. The album also debuted at number one on the Billboard Heatseekers Album chart, number eleven on the Billboard R&B Albums chart and number eighteen on the Billboard Top R&B/Hip-Hop Albums.

Track listing
Writing and production credits for the songs are taken from the booklet in Crash and Burn.

Credits and personnel
The following credits were adapted from AllMusic:

 Traci Braxton – primary artist, producer
 Danielle Brimm – artists and repertoire
 Ray Cox – photography
 Shawnte Crespo – product manager
 Raheem DeVaughn – featured artist
 Isabel Evans – artists and repertoire
 Nate Fields – guitar (bass)
 Paul Grosso – creative director
 Jamil Johnson – mixing
 Jamil "Face" Johnson – mixing
 Cliff Jones – executive producer, producer
 Kenneth Epperson, Jr. – producer, production assistant
 Chris Lewis – engineer, mixing
 Chris "Symfonikz" Lewis – producer
 Dave Lindsey – engineer, mixing
 Dave "DaveyBoy" Lindsey – producer
 David Lindsey – executive producer, producer
 Sean Marlowe – art direction, design
 Joe Moore – production assistant
 Tommie Reed – artists and repertoire
 Kevin Rutledge – producer
 Julia Sutowski – coordinating producer
 Big Bob Terry – producer
 Bob Terry – producer

Charts

Release history

References

External links 
 

2014 debut albums
Traci Braxton albums